Koshkuiyeh (also Romanized as Koshkū’īyeh and Kashkū’īyeh; also known as Qūshk, and Kūshku) is a city and capital of Koshkuiyeh District, in Rafsanjan County, Kerman Province, Iran.  At the 2006 census, its population was 6,150, in 1,428 families.

References

Populated places in Rafsanjan County
Cities in Kerman Province